Sydney James Law (23 November 1856 – 7 October 1939) was an Australian politician.

Born in Redfern to cabinet maker John Law and Sarah Pollard, he established what would become a highly successful drapery shop in Balmain around 1881. On 4 July 1883 he married Mary Maclean, with whom he had two children. Having joined the Balmain Labour League in 1891, he was elected to the New South Wales Legislative Assembly as the member for Balmain South in 1894. In 1902 he resigned from the party and the parliament winning the resulting by-election on 6 December as an Independent Labour member. In 1904 he was elected to the seat of Rozelle as a Liberal. Defeated in 1907, he became an auctioneer in 1909 and became active in New South Wales sectarian politics as a Protestant. Law died at Drummoyne in 1939.

References

 

1856 births
1939 deaths
Independent members of the Parliament of New South Wales
Members of the New South Wales Legislative Assembly
Australian businesspeople
Australian Labor Party members of the Parliament of New South Wales